James H. Johnson may refer to:

James H. Johnson (figure skater) (1874–1921), British silver medalist in pairs figure skating at the 1908 Summer Olympics
James H. Johnson (major general) (born 1929), major general in the U.S. Army
James H. Johnson Jr. (born 1937), lieutenant general in the U.S. Army
James Hervey Johnson (1901–1988), American atheist
James Hutchins Johnson (1802–1887), U.S. congressman from New Hampshire